Doctor Baek Sung-hee (born 1970) is a South Korean scientist specialising in molecular genetics. Her work is focused on the chromatin dynamics and epigenetic regulatory mechanism in cancer. She received her BS, MS, and Ph.D. degrees from Seoul National University. Following her postdoctoral research in Michael Rosenfeld’s lab at HHMI and following research assistant professor at HHMI, she joined the faculty of Seoul National University in 2003, and now works as an associate professor. Dr. Baek received numerous awards and honors, including the L’Oreal-UNESCO for Women in Science Award.

Awards
2005 L’OREAL-UNESCO for Women in Science Award 
2012 The Women in Science and Technology Award 2012, Korea Science and Engineering Foundation
2015 Kyung-Ahm Prize

Publications

References

External links
SBAEK LAB.

1970 births
Living people
Date of birth missing (living people)
Molecular genetics